The 1992–93 Segunda División B season was the 16th since its establishment. The first matches of the season were played on 5 September 1992, and the season ended in 27 June 1993 with the promotion play-off final games.

Overview before the season
80 teams joined the league, including 3 relegated from the 1991–92 Segunda División and 18 promoted from the 1991–92 Tercera División. The composition of the groups was determined by the Royal Spanish Football Federation, attending to geographical criteria.

Relegated from Segunda División
Murcia
Avilés
Las Palmas

Promoted from Tercera División

Aranjuez
Racing Ferrol
Celta Turista
Alcalá
Elgoibar
Beasain
Andorra
Izarra
Valencia B
Llíria
Horadada
Ibiza
San Roque
Écija
Toledo
Sevilla B
Mensajero
Cacereño

Group 1
Teams from Asturias, Castile and Leon, Castilla–La Mancha, Galicia and Madrid.

Teams

League table

Results

Top goalscorers

Top goalkeepers

Group 2
Teams from Andorra, Aragon, Basque Country, Cantabria, Castile and Leon, La Rioja and Navarre.

Teams

League table

Results

Top goalscorers

Top goalkeepers

Group 3
Teams from Balearic Islands, Catalonia, Region of Murcia and Valencian Community.

Teams

League table

Results

Top goalscorers

Top goalkeepers

Group 4
Teams from Andalusia, Canary Islands, Extremadura and Melilla.

Teams

League table

Results

Top goalscorers

Top goalkeepers

Play-offs

 
Segunda División B seasons
3

Spain